Yuzhnoportovy District   is an administrative district (raion) of South-Eastern Administrative Okrug, and one of the 125 raions of Moscow, Russia. Population: 73,178 (2017 est.),

See also
Administrative divisions of Moscow

References

Notes

Sources

Districts of Moscow